Christopher Bevan (born 9 April 1937) is a retired Rhodesian sailor. He competed at the 1960 Summer Olympics in the "Flying Dutchman" event, paired with Alan David Butler, and finished in fourth place.

References 

1937 births
Living people
Sportspeople from London
White Rhodesian people
British emigrants to Rhodesia
Olympic sailors of Rhodesia
Rhodesian male sailors (sport)
Sailors at the 1960 Summer Olympics – Flying Dutchman